Trebizond may refer to:

 Trabzon, a city in Turkey formerly known as Trebizond
 Empire of Trebizond (1204–1461), a successor state to the Eastern Roman Empire
 Trebizond Eyalet (1598–1867), a province of the Ottoman Empire
 Vilayet of Trebizond (1867–1923), a province of the Ottoman Empire

See also
 The Towers of Trebizond, a 1956 novel by Rose Macaulay